The 6th International Emmy Kids Awards ceremony took place on April 10, 2018, in Cannes, France. The nominations were announced by the International Academy of Television Arts and Sciences (IATAS) on October 16, 2017. They are the only Emmys presented outside the U.S.

Ceremony information
Nominations for the 6th International Emmy Kids Awards were announced on October 16, 2017, by the International Academy of Television Arts and Sciences (IATAS) during a press conference at MIPCOM in Cannes, France. The winners were announced on April 10, 2018, at the Carlton Hotel, in Cannes, France during MIPTV. The winners spanned series from Canada, France, Germany, Norway and the United Kingdom.

Winners

References

External links 
 International Academy of Television Arts and Sciences website

International Emmy Kids Awards ceremonies
International Emmy Kids Awards
International Emmy Kids Awards
International Emmy Kids Awards
International Emmy Kids Awards